Kiato railway station is a station in Kiato in the northern Peloponnese, Greece. The station is located 1 km west of the town, near the A8 motorway between Athens and Patras. It was opened on 9 July 2007. The station is served by Line 2 and Line 5 of the Athens Suburban Railway between Piraeus and Aigio. It should not be confused with the now-closed station on the old Piraeus–Patras railway, which is located northeast of the current station, closer to the coast of the Corinthian Gulf.

History
It opened on 9 July 2007 as the western terminus of the new standard-gauge line from Athens Airport. In 2009, with the Greek debt crisis unfolding OSE's Management was forced to reduce services across the network. Timetables were cutback and routes closed, as the government-run entity attempted to reduce overheads. Initially, Kiato railway station served as an exchange point for passengers to Patras on the old metre-gauge line from Piraeus, but all regional services on the metre-gauge lines of the Peloponnese were suspended indefinitely in December 2010 for cost reasons. The old  nearby was also closed. In 2017 OSE's passenger transport sector was privatised as TrainOSE, currently a wholly-owned subsidiary of Ferrovie dello Stato Italiane infrastructure, including stations, remained under the control of OSE. In July 2022, the station began being served by Hellenic Train, the rebranded TranOSE.

Facilities
The raised station is assessed via stairs or a ramp. It has one side platform and one island platform, with station buildings located on platform 1, with access to the platform level via stairs or lifts. The Station buildings are equipped with a booking office (not yet operational) and toilets. At platform level, there are sheltered seating, an air-conditioned indoor passenger shelter (as of 2020 not open) and Dot-matrix display departure and arrival screens and timetable poster boards on both platforms. There is a large car park on-site, adjacent to the eastbound line. Currently, there is no local bus stop connecting the station.

Services

Since 15 May 2022, this station serves the following routes:

 Athens Suburban Railway Line 2 towards , with up to one train per hour;
 Athens Suburban Railway Line 5 towards , with six trains per day, from 07:00 to 20:00.

Pending the electrification of the Kiato–Aigio section, passengers must change between electric and diesel trains at Kiato. Those travelling to and from the airport may also take lines 1 and 2, changing trains at Kato Acharnai. Pending the completion of the Athens Airport–Patras railway, passengers travelling to and from Patras may use the TrainOSE bus lines which connect the city with Kiato, Diakopto and Aigio stations. Diakopto is also the terminus of the unique rack railway to Kalavryta.

Station layout

Gallery

See also
Athens railway station
Corinth railway station
Aigio railway station
Hellenic Railways Organization
TrainOSE
Proastiakos
P.A.Th.E./P.

References

Railway stations in Corinthia
Buildings and structures in Corinthia
Railway stations opened in 2007
2007 establishments in Greece